mt Xinu (from the letters in "Unix™", reversed) was a software company founded in 1983 that produced two operating systems.  Its slogan "We know Unix™ backwards and forwards" was an allusion to the company's name and abilities.

mt Xinu offered several products:

 mt Xinu was a commercially licensed version of the BSD Unix operating system for the DEC VAX. The initial version was based on 4.1cBSD; later versions were based on 4.2 and 4.3BSD.
 more/BSD was mt Xinu's version of 4.3BSD-Tahoe for VAX and HP 9000, incorporating code from the University of Utah's HPBSD. It included NFS.
 Mach386 was a hybrid of Mach 2.5/2.6 and 4.3BSD-Tahoe/Reno for 386 and 486-based IBM PC compatibles.

Apart from operating systems, mt Xinu also produced Apple-Unix interoperability software, including an AppleShare server for Unix.

The company's principals were University of California, Berkeley computer science students and graduates, notably Bob Kridle, Alan Tobey, Ed Gould, and Vance Vaughan. Debbie Scherrer was a later contributor.

mt Xinu is also famous for its light-hearted Unix-themed calendars, including:

 Command of the Month (1987–1988)
 Lessons in Art (1989)
 Platform of the Year (1990)

In 1991 a division of mt Xinu broke off to become Xinet.

Notes

References
 

Berkeley Software Distribution
Mach (kernel)
Unix history